L. M. Gillespie was one of the first women police officers in Philadelphia, Pennsylvania.

Biography
She and Mary Diehl were assigned to railroad stations, but they had full authority in all of the city of Philadelphia. They were provided with a revolver, black-jack, nippers (a form of single-wrist handcuff), and badge, all identical with other members of the Philadelphia police force. Women police officers did not start patrolling the streets of Philadelphia until 1976.

References

American women police officers
People from Philadelphia
Year of death missing
Year of birth missing